Stuart Brightwell (born 31 January 1979) is a former English football midfielder who spent one season in the USL First Division in the USA. He last played for Horden Colliery Welfare A.F.C. in the Northern League. Currently, he works as a coach at the i2i International Soccer Academy. .

Brightwell came up through the Manchester United youth system, before transferring to Hartlepool United in 1998. Brightwell played in 20 games for the Monkey Hangers. He then played for Bishop Auckland and Durham City. In November 2002, he transferred from Durham City to Spennymoor United. In the summer of 2004, he moved back to Durham City before transferring to Billingham Town on 12 October 2004.

At Hetton Lyons CC, he scored a hattrick in the FA Sunday Cup Final.

In May 2007, Brightwell signed with the Carolina RailHawks of the USL First Division. He played well, seeing extensive playing time, but was released by the team at the end of the season.

References

External links

Stuart Brightwell at NonLeagueDaily.com

1979 births
Living people
Sportspeople from Easington, County Durham
Footballers from County Durham
English footballers
Manchester United F.C. players
Hartlepool United F.C. players
Bishop Auckland F.C. players
Durham City A.F.C. players
Spennymoor United F.C. players
Billingham Town F.C. players
North Carolina FC players
Darlington Town F.C. players
English Football League players
USL First Division players
Sunderland A.F.C. non-playing staff
People educated at Easington Community Science College
Association football midfielders
English expatriate sportspeople in the United States
Expatriate soccer players in the United States
English expatriate footballers